The Mercedes-Benz W125 Rekordwagen was an experimental, high-speed automobile produced in the late 1930s. The streamlined car was derived from the 1937 open-wheel race car Mercedes-Benz W125 Formel-Rennwagen, of which also a streamlined version was raced at the non-championship Avusrennen in Berlin.

The main difference to the Grand Prix race car, which had to adhere to the  limit, was the engine. While the GP car had the 8-cylinder inline M125, which was rather tall, the record car was fitted with a V12 engine that was lower, which reduced drag.

The car is on display in the Mercedes-Benz Museum in Stuttgart.

1938 Mercedes-Benz W125 specifications 
 Engine: MD 25 DAB/3 60 Degree V12
 Engine position: Front longitudinal
 Aspiration: Twin Roots superchargers
 Valvetrain: DOHC 4 valves per cylinder
 Displacement: 7956.75 cc / 488.31 in³ (82.0 x 88.0 mm)
 Compression: 9.17:1
 Power:  @ 5800 rpm
 Transmission: 4-speed manual 
 Engine cooling: Ice supplemented normal coolant as air intakes were kept very small to improve aerodynamic flow over and around the car

The record 
Rudolf Caracciola's record of 432.7 km/h (268 mph) over the flying kilometre on 28 January 1938, remained the fastest ever officially timed speed on a public road until broken on 5 November 2017 by Koenigsegg in an Agera RS driven by Niklas Lilja, achieving 445.6 km/h (276.9 mph) on a closed highway in Nevada. It also was the fastest speed ever recorded in Germany until Rico Anthes bested it with a Top Fuel Dragster on the Hockenheimring drag strip.

This record breaking run was made on the Reichs-Autobahn A5 between Frankfurt and Darmstadt, where onlookers were rattled by the brutal boom of the side spewing exhaust stacks as the silver car hurtled past. By nine that morning, Caracciola and team chief Alfred Neubauer were having a celebration breakfast at the Park Hotel in Frankfurt.

Popular driver Bernd Rosemeyer was killed later the same day when trying to beat that record for Auto Union. This also put an end to the record attempts of Mercedes, even though Hans Stuck later wanted to beat the overall land speed record with the Porsche-designed Mercedes-Benz T80 which was powered by a  airplane engine.

== Porsche Rekordwagen ==

In 1937, Joseph Mickl the chief R&D engineer of Porsche filed a patent for a high speed vehicle, which made use of a wide range of techniques making it most probably the most advanced vehicle of its kind for that time. This patent, is considered as the successor of the w125 Rekordwagen .

It is possible to identify many features on this patented design that spun out of the research work of famous researchers of that time such as Ludwig Prandtl, Wunibald Kamm, Theodore von Kármán etc. The streamlined, low drag body of the vehicle is equipped with an air inlet for the engine which is conveniently located at the maximum static pressure region at the "nose". The body completely engulfs the wheels thus eliminating their additional aerodynamic drag. The vehicle is equipped with 6 wheels (occurring long before the Tyrrell P34 of the late 70s). The main reason for that design choice is the maximization of the contact area with the ground with a simultaneous reduction of the frontal area of the vehicle (i.e. low drag). At the same time the rear wheel axles could remain lower thus reducing the frontal area as well as the center of gravity of the vehicle.

The body of the vehicle is formed like a very basic diffuser thus using the Bernoulli principle in order to create downforce and improve stability and traction at high speeds. This may be one of the first uses of the Ground Effect, decades before it appeared on the BRM and Chaparral Formula One racers of the 60s.

Another great innovation of that design/patent of Mickl was the integration of an inverted wing which was responsible for the creation of downforce, thus increasing the stability of the vehicle. Most of the people believe that the use of wings to create downforce on vehicles is an idea of the 1960s pioneered by Colin Chapman and his Lotus 49 racer. However, the truth is that the German rocket powered rail-racer of the late 1920s Opel-RAK.3 was the earliest example of a vehicle equipped with wings creating downforce. This vehicle, however, did not use inverted wings but rather normal wings that were pitched to a negative angle of attack such that they would generate "negative lift".

The racer of Mickl, however, employs an inverted wing, located directly on top of the rear wheel axles and in the "clean" air inflow stream in order to produce downforce and to translate it directly to tire traction at high speeds. The inverted wing was even equipped with a large aileron, such that the driver could adjust the generated downforce in such a way that the vehicle could achieve high traction during the acceleration phase and low drag (i.e. low downforce) during the high-speed phase of the race. A further invention was presented with the implementation of an airbrake option. In this case the aileron of the wing would deflect almost 90° thus hugely increasing drag and acting as a high speed air brake. That action could be manually controlled by the driver via a separate air-brake lever or could be coupled to the wheel brake system of the vehicle.

References

W125 Rekordwagen
W125 Rekordwagen
Wheel-driven land speed record cars

de:Mercedes-Benz W 125#Rekordwagen W 125